Minervarya sauriceps (lizard-headed frog or Mysore wart frog) is a species of frog that is endemic to the Western Ghats, India. It is only known from its type locality, Wattekole in Kodagu district, Karnataka state.

References

sauriceps
Frogs of India
Endemic fauna of the Western Ghats
Taxa named by C. R. Narayan Rao
Amphibians described in 1937
Taxobox binomials not recognized by IUCN